St John Bosco College is a Roman Catholic English medium school located in Lucknow, Uttar Pradesh, India, established in 1988.

About the college
St John Bosco College is an English medium school situated in Vivek Khand-3, Gomti Nagar, Lucknow. It is an unaided Roman Catholic English medium college, established and administered by the St. Don Bosco Educational Society, registered under the Societies Registration Act. The college was founded in 1988 to educate Catholic students in a manner that conserves their religion, language and culture, but admission is not denied to students of other faiths. The college is named after St John Bosco (Saint Don Bosco), a priest, educationist and youth reformer.

The school was established by the late Dr. Mrs. Vimla Frank, a teacher and youth reformer.

Education
The school is affiliated to the Council for the Indian School Certificate Examination, New Delhi. The school has a library and science laboratories. The school is co-educational up to class XII. English is the medium of instruction and examination in the college.

Students are allotted one of four houses, named after teacher-cum-priests of Christian faith.  Mr. Pradeep Frank is the Manager of this college from its existence.

Co-curricular activities
Essay competition
Debate
Elocution quizzes
Art
Painting
Needlework
Embroidery
Soft toys
Clay modelling
First aid
Dance and dramatics
Music - vocal and instrumental
 Sports and games

The school provides support for the NCC (National Cadet Corps). A Division Army wing is available in the school.

Catholic schools in India
High schools and secondary schools in Uttar Pradesh
Christian schools in Uttar Pradesh
Schools in Lucknow
Educational institutions established in 1988
1988 establishments in Uttar Pradesh